John Hale Shenefield (born January 23, 1939) is an American attorney who served as the United States Associate Attorney General from 1979 to 1981 and as the Assistant Attorney General for the Antitrust Division from May 1977 to February 1979.

Early life and education 
Shenefield was born in Toledo, Ohio. He earned a Bachelor of Arts degree from Harvard College and a Bachelor of Laws from Harvard Law School. He served in the United States Army in 1961 and 1962.

Career 
After graduating from law school, Shenefield practiced antitrust law at Hunton and Williams in Richmond, Virginia for 12 years. He also worked as an economics professor at the University of Richmond. From May 1977 to February 1979, he served as the Assistant Attorney General for the Antitrust Division. He then served as the United States Associate Attorney General from 1979 to 1981. After the end of the Carter administration, Shenefield became a partner at Morgan, Lewis & Bockius.

References 
Living people

1939 births
People from Toledo, Ohio
Ohio lawyers
Harvard College alumni
Harvard Law School alumni
United States Associate Attorneys General